Grevé is a Swedish cow's milk cheese which is similar to  Emmental cheese.  The semi-hard cheese  has a  nut-like, slightly sweet taste and a fat content of 30-45%. It was first produced in 1964 at Örnsköldsvik in Västernorrland County, Sweden. The name Grevé does not mean anything; the cheese was created under the working name ”Alpost” (Alp-cheese) and the producers wanted a name that would sound similar to Swiss cheese names, for example Gruyère.

References 

Swedish cheeses
Cow's-milk cheeses